Kilmartin is a surname with Irish and Scottish  origins. People with the name include:

 Gerald Kilmartin (1927–1970), American ice hockey player
 John F. Kilmartin (1921–2004)
 Laurie Kilmartin, American comedian
 Pamela M. Kilmartin, New Zealand astronomer
 Peter Kilmartin (b. 1962), American attorney
 Terence Kilmartin (1922–1991), Irish journalist and translator